Leicestershire (postal abbreviation Leics.) is a ceremonial and non-metropolitan county in the East Midlands, England. The county borders Nottinghamshire to the north, Lincolnshire to the north-east, Rutland to the east, Northamptonshire to the south-east, Warwickshire to the south-west, Staffordshire to the west, and Derbyshire to the north-west. The border with most of Warwickshire is Watling Street, the modern A5 road.

Leicestershire takes its name from the city of Leicester located at its centre and administered separately from the rest of the county. The ceremonial county – the non-metropolitan county plus the city of Leicester – has a total population of just over 1 million (2016 estimate), more than half of which lives in the Leicester Urban Area.

History

Leicestershire was recorded in the Domesday Book in four wapentakes: Guthlaxton, Framland, Goscote, and Gartree. These later became hundreds, with the division of Goscote into West Goscote and East Goscote, and the addition of Sparkenhoe hundred. In 1087, the first recorded use of the name was as Lægrecastrescir.

Leicestershire's external boundaries have changed little since the Domesday Survey. The Measham-Donisthorpe exclave of Derbyshire has been exchanged for the Netherseal area, and the urban expansion of Market Harborough has caused Little Bowden, previously in Northamptonshire to be annexed.

In 1974, the Local Government Act 1972 abolished the county borough status of Leicester city and the county status of neighbouring Rutland, converting both to administrative districts of Leicestershire. These actions were reversed on 1 April 1997, when Rutland and the City of Leicester became unitary authorities. Rutland became a distinct Ceremonial County once again, although it continues to be policed by Leicestershire Constabulary.

The symbol of the county council, Leicestershire County Cricket Club and Leicester City FC, is the fox. Leicestershire is considered to be the birthplace of fox hunting as it is known today. Hugo Meynell, who lived in Quorn, is known as the father of fox hunting. Melton Mowbray and Market Harborough have associations with fox hunting, as has neighbouring Rutland.

Leicestershire was the last historic county of England to get a registered flag, the design being officiated in July 2021. The new flag features a fox and a cinquefoil – both symbols often associated with Leicestershire.

Geography

The River Soar together with its tributaries and canalisations constitutes the principal river basin of the county, although the River Avon and River Welland through Harborough and along the county's southern boundaries are also significant. The Soar rises between Hinckley and Lutterworth, towards the south of the county near the Warwickshire border, and flows northwards, bisecting the county along its north–south axis, through 'Greater' Leicester and then to the east of Loughborough where its course within the county comes to an end. It continues north marking the boundary with Nottinghamshire in the Borough of Rushcliffe for some  before joining the River Trent at the point where Derbyshire, Leicestershire, and Nottinghamshire meet.

The geographical centre of England is in Leicestershire, near Fenny Drayton in the southwest of the county. In 2013, the Ordnance Survey calculated that the point was on land at Lindley Hall Farm; Meriden, around 10 miles (16 km) to the southwest, had been considered the traditional centre for more than 500 years.

A large part of the north-west of the county, around Coalville, forms part of the new National Forest area extending into Derbyshire and Staffordshire.

Demographics

The population of Leicestershire (excluding Leicester Unitary Authority) is 609,578 people (2001 census). The county covers an area of 2,084 km2 (804 sq mi). Its largest population centre is the city of Leicester, followed by the town of Loughborough. Other large towns include Ashby-de-la-Zouch, Coalville, Hinckley, Lutterworth, Market Harborough, Melton Mowbray, Oadby, Shepshed and Wigston.

Some of the larger of villages are: Burbage (population estimated around 16,500 in 2014), Birstall (population 11,400 in 2004), Broughton Astley, Castle Donington, Kibworth Beauchamp (along with Kibworth Harcourt), Great Glen, Ibstock, Countesthorpe and Kegworth. One of the most rapidly expanding villages is Anstey, which has recently seen many development schemes.

The United Kingdom Census 2001 showed a total resident population for Leicester of 279,921, a 0.5% decrease from the 1991 census (this trend since reversing at the 2011 census). Approximately 62,000 were aged under 16, 199,000 were aged 16–74, and 19,000 aged 75 and over. 76.9% of Leicester's population claim they have been born in the UK, according to the 2001 UK Census. Mid-year estimates for 2006 indicate that the population of the City of Leicester stood at 289,700 making Leicester the most populous city in East Midlands.

Of those aged 16–74 in Leicester, 38.5% had no academic qualifications, significantly higher than 28.9% in all of England. 23.0% of Leicester's residents were born outside of the United Kingdom, more than double than the English average of 9.2%.

Economy

Engineering
Engineering has long been an important part of the economy of Leicestershire. John Taylor Bellfounders continues a history of bellfounding in Loughborough since the 14th century. In 1881 John Taylors cast the largest bell in Britain, "Great Paul", for St Paul's Cathedral in London. Norman & Underwood have been making sand cast sheet lead roofing and stained glass since 1825 working on many of England's major cathedrals and historic buildings, including Salisbury Cathedral, Windsor Castle, Westminster Abbey, Hampton Court Palace, and Chatsworth House. There were three coal mines that operated in Coalville from the 1820s until 1986. Abbey Pumping Station houses four enormous steam powered beam engines built in Leicester in the 1890s in the Vulcan factory owned by Josiah Gimson, whose son Ernest Gimson was an influential furniture designer and architect of the English arts and crafts movement.

Engineering companies today include sports car makers Noble Automotive Ltd in Barwell and Ultima Sports Ltd in Hinckley, Triumph Motorcycles in Hinckley, Jones & Shipman (machine tools), Caterpillar Redford (Plant machinery), Plant manufacturers Metalfacture Ltd (sheet metal work), Richards Engineering (foundry equipment), Transmon Engineering (materials handling equipment), Trelleborg Industrial AVS in Beaumont Leys (industrial suspension components), Parker Plant (quarrying equipment), Aggregate Industries UK (construction materials), Infotec in Ashby-de-la-Zouch (electronic information display boards), Alstec in Whetstone, Leicestershire (airport baggage handling systems), and Brush Traction (railway locomotives) in Loughborough. Local commitment to nurturing the upcoming cadre of British engineers includes apprenticeship schemes with local companies, and academic-industrial connections with the engineering departments at Leicester University, De Montfort University, and Loughborough University.

The Systems Engineering Innovation Centre and Centre for Excellence for low carbon and fuel cell technologies are both based at Loughborough University. Private sector research and development organisations include PERA – the technology based consultancy in Melton Mowbray, and MIRA – the automotive research and development centre based on the outskirts of Hinckley.  Automotive and aerospace engineers use the test facilities at Mallory Park, and Bruntingthorpe Aerodrome and proving ground.  On 18 October 2007, the last airworthy Avro Vulcan was flown from Bruntingthorpe Aerodrome after 10 years of restoration there by aerospace engineers of the Vulcan Operating Company.

Farming

Leicestershire has a long history of livestock farming which continues today. Robert Bakewell (1725–1795) of Dishley, near Loughborough, was a revolutionary in the field of selective breeding. Bakewell's Leicester Longwool sheep was much prized by farmers across the British Empire and is today a heritage breed admired. Commercial and rare breeds associated with the descendants of Bakewell's sheep include the English Leicester, Border Leicester, Bluefaced Leicester, Scotch mule, and Welsh halfbred.

The Leicestershire County Show is held on the first Bank Holiday in May each year and includes animal showings, trade exhibitions, and show jumping.  Melton Mowbray Market is an important regional livestock market.

Field sports remain an important part of the rural economy of Leicestershire, with stables, kennels, and gunsmiths based in the county.

Food and drink
Stilton and Red Leicester cheeses and the pork pie are the three most famous contributions to English cuisine from Leicestershire.

Leicestershire food producers include Claybrooke mill, one of the very few commercially working watermills left in Britain producing a range of over 40 flours; meat from rare and minority breeds from Brockleby's; and Christmas turkey and goose from Seldom Seen Farm. Two dairies produce Red Leicester cheese in the county, Long Clawson and the Leicestershire Handmade Cheese Company.

All-natural non-alcoholic fruit cordials and pressed drinks are made by Belvoir Fruit Farms and sold in supermarkets across Britain. Swithland Spring Water is sourced from the Charnwood hills. Breweries in Leicestershire and Rutland are listed on the Leicester CAMRA website. The county's largest beer brewer is Everards, and there are several microbreweries such as Belvoir Brewery in Old Dalby, Parish Brewery in Burrough on the Hill, Wicked Hathern Brewery in Loughborough, the Gas Dog Brewery at Somerby near Melton, Ellis Wood brewery in Hinckley, and the Pig Pub Brewery in Claybrooke Magna near Lutterworth.  Vineyards in Leicestershire include Chevelswarde Vineyard (Lutterworth), Welland Valley Vineyard (Market Harborough), Eglantine (Loughborough) and Rothley Wines (Rothley). Melton Mowbray Sloe Gin is a liqueur with a distinctive flavour.

Various markets are held across the county. Leicester Market is the largest outdoor covered marketplace in Europe and among the products on sale are fruit and vegetables sold by market stallholders, and fresh fish and meat in the Indoor Market.

The annual East Midlands Food & Drink Festival held in Melton Mowbray had over 200 exhibitors and 20,000 visitors attending in 2007 making it the largest British regional food festival.

Food processing in the city and county includes popular British fish and chip shop pie Pukka Pies who are based in Syston. Walkers Midshire Foods, part of the Samworth Brothers group, makes sausages and pies in its Beaumont Leys factories. Samworth Brothers has operations in Leicestershire and Cornwall (Ginsters), making a range of products from sandwiches to desserts for UK retailers under their brands as well the company's own portfolio of brands including Dickinson & Morris, producers of pork pies and Melton Hunt Cake. Walkers crisps are made in Beaumont Leys using Lincolnshire potatoes. United Biscuits have their distribution centre in Ashby-de-la-Zouch as well as a snacks factory producing brands such as Hula Hoops, Skips, Nik Naks and Space Raiders and they also have a biscuit factory in Wigston. The Masterfoods UK factory at Melton Mowbray produces petfood for brands such as Cesar, Kitekat, PAL, Pedigree, Sheba, Whiskas, Aquarian and Trill. Hand made chocolates are produced by Chocolate Perfection in Ashby-de-la-Zouch.

Some 15 major Indian food manufacturers are based in Leicester including Sara Foods, Mayur Foods, Cofresh Snack Foods Ltd, Farsan, Apni Roti, and Spice n Tice. The 'Mithai' Indian sweet market is catered for by award-winning Indian restaurants – for instance the vegetable samosas approved by the Vegetarian Society sold at The Sharmilee on Belgrave Road in the Belgrave area of Leicester. The growing market for Indian food has afforded new opportunities to long-standing local companies, for example the Long Clawson dairy, a co-operative manufacturer of Stilton (cheese) now also makes Paneer cheese used in the Indian dish Mattar Paneer.

Leicestershire food exported abroad includes cheese from the Long Clawson dairy, which is sold in supermarkets in Canada and the United States via a network of distributors coordinated by Taunton-based company Somerdale. Belvoir Fruit Farms cordials and pressé drinks are sold on the United States east coast in Wegmans Food Markets, World Market, Harris Teeter, Dean & DeLuca, and in specialised British food stores such as Myers of Keswick (New York City), and the British Pantry (near Washington, D.C.).

The annual Leicestershire & Rutland Restaurant Awards has several categories including Leicestershire & Rutland Restaurant of the Year, Best Asian Restaurant, Best Service, Best Newcomer, Best Fine Dining Restaurant, Best Value for Money, Best Drinks/Wine List, Best Local Produce Menu, Best Gastro Pub, Best Neighbourhood Restaurant, Best Business Lunch, and Leicestershire & Rutland Young Chef of the Year.

Clothing
Leicester and Leicestershire has had a traditional industry of knitwear, hosiery and footwear, and the sheep on the county's coat of arms is recognition of this. The local manufacturing industry, which began with hand knitting in the Middle Ages, and was fully industrialised by the end of the 19th century, survived until the end of the 20th century through retailers buying UK sourced products, and government measures such as the protection of the Multi Fibre Arrangement which ended in 2004. Cheaper global competition, coupled with the 1999 slump in the UK fashion retail sector, led to the end of much of the cheaper clothing manufacturing industry. Today Leicestershire companies focus on high quality clothing and speciality textiles.

Other local companies manufacture knitwear such as Commando Knitwear of Wigston, and others specialise in technical textiles for industrial or medical purposes. Clothing and fabric for the British Asian community is made here – for example the shop Saree Mandir sells silk saree's and salwar suits for women whose design patterns closely follow contemporary Indian trends. The Knitting Industries' Federation continues to be based in Leicestershire. On the creative side the design centre for next is headquartered in Enderby, and the design centre for George Clothing (Asda/Walmart) is in Lutterworth. De Montfort University has, in the form of its Fashion and Contour Design course a leading design department for female underwear. It also has the only UK University courses in Footwear Design providing future designers for local shoemakers Shoefayre, Stead and Simpson, and Shoe Zone, who all have their headquarters in the county.

Gola also originates from the county.

Healthcare

University Hospitals Leicester NHS Trust employs around 11,000 at its three hospitals in the city and county, the Glenfield, the General and the Royal Infirmary. Leicestershire Partnership NHS Trust employs over 5,500 staff providing mental health, learning disability and community health services in the city and county. These services are commissioned by the three Clinical Commissioning Groups, led by local GPs.
The British Psychological Society, the Institution of Occupational Safety and Health (IOSH) based in Wigston, and the National Examination Board in Occupational Safety and Health (NEBOSH) have their head offices in Leicestershire.

Biomedical industries
Pharmaceutical, biotechnology and medical instrument manufacturing companies include 3M, Bridgehead International in Melton, Fisher Scientific in Loughborough, and Ashfield Healthcare in Ashby-de-la-Zouch.

Freight and distribution

Transportation links are good. East Midlands Airport is one mile (1.6 km) south of Castle Donington, next to the M1 in north-west Leicestershire, and is the second largest freight airport in the United Kingdom after London Heathrow. DHL Aviation have a large purpose built facility at EMA, and courier companies UPS and TNT also use the airport as a base. Lufthansa Cargo is also a regular user of East Midlands, and the airport is a primary hub for Royal Mail. The M1 is Leicestershire's other important transport hub. The start of the M6, and part of the A14 briefly intersect with the southern tip of Leicestershire. Many large retail companies have huge warehouses at the Magna Park complex near Lutterworth. The Widdowson Group make use of J21a of the M1 to provide warehousing, transportation, freight forwarding, garage services and LGV/HGV training. Pall-Ex of Ellistown provide automated palletised freight distribution services from their location off Junction 22 of the M1. The Midland Main Line provides important connections to Yorkshire and London, and the Birmingham–Stansted Line is essentially Leicestershire's east–west connection from Hinckley to Melton.

Other
Ibstock-based developer Wilson Bowden was bought in 2007 by Barratt Developments plc in a GBP2.2 billion deal.  Charles Street Buildings (Leicester) and Jelson Homes are two other successful Leicester-based property companies.

Hamilton-based Sofidel Group manufactures more than 600 million toilet rolls and kitchen towel rolls per year in its Leicestershire factories.

Toy car company Corgi have their European operation at the Meridian Business Park, although the toys are now manufactured in China and the company is owned by Margate-based Hornby.

Leicestershire is twinned with Kilkenny, Ireland.

Leicester's Cultural Quarter is an ambitious plan to drive the regeneration of a large run-down area of the city. It has delivered: a new venue for the performing arts, Curve; creative workspaces for artists and designers, LCB Depot; and a Digital Media Centre. Many creative and media businesses have thrived in the region.

As part of a 2002 marketing campaign, the plant conservation charity Plantlife chose the foxglove as the county flower.

Financial and business services
Financial and business service companies with operations in Leicestershire include Alliance & Leicester, Cambridge & Counties Bank, Royal Bank of Scotland, State Bank of India, HSBC, and PricewaterhouseCoopers.

Pension provision company Mattioli Woods employs 170 people at its Grove Park, Enderby, HQ and has a reputation for employing graduates directly from Leicestershire Universities.

Companies that have their head office in the area include Next (clothing), and British Gas Business.

The Institute of Credit Management, the European Association of Trade Mark Owners, and the Point of Purchase Advertising International (POPAI) are based in Leicestershire.

Key stakeholders promoting economic development formed Leicester & Leicestershire Economic Partnership in 2011. Leicestershire Chamber of Commerce is another good source for business advice.

Business awards
The Leicestershire Business Awards has categories including Investing in Leicestershire, Contribution to the Community, and Entrepreneur of the Year.

Recent Leicestershire winners of the Queen's Award for Enterprise are listed on the Lord Lieutenant's website.

Statistics
This is a chart of trend of regional gross value added of the non-metropolitan county of Leicestershire and Rutland (it does not include the City of Leicester) at current basic prices published (pp. 240–253) by Office for National Statistics with figures in millions of British Pounds Sterling.

Governance
For lieutenancy purposes, Leicestershire consists of the non-metropolitan county and the City of Leicester.

For administrative purposes, most of the county is run by the Leicestershire County Council, though the City of Leicester is run independently by the Leicester City Council. The non-metropolitan county is divided into seven districts ran by district councils: The seven district councils in Leicestershire are Blaby, Charnwood, Harborough, Hinckley & Bosworth, Melton, North West Leicestershire and Oadby & Wigston. It has been proposed by the Leicestershire County Council in 2018 to get rid of the district councils.

Leicestershire County Council consists of 55 elected members, from 52 wards. The most recent election was the May 2017 elections, where all seats were up for re-election. Following these elections the current political composition of the council is 42 Conservatives, 9 Liberal Democrats and 4 Labour councillors.

Below the County Council, there are seven district councils, Blaby, Charnwood, Harborough, Hinckley and Bosworth, Melton, North West Leicestershire and Oadby and Wigston. The City of Leicester is a unitary authority which is separate from the county for local government, and provides all services in its area; the City Council meets at Leicester Town Hall.

Parliamentary constituencies 

Leicestershire is represented by ten members of parliament (MPs). Three seats within the City of Leicester were won by Labour Party MPs at the last general election, though Claudia Webbe currently represents Leicester East as an independent having been suspended by the party following a criminal conviction; the other seven Leicestershire seats are represented by Conservative MPs.

Education 

Publicly funded secondary schools in Leicestershire are comprehensive. The schools are segregated by age in some areas to ages 10–14 (middle schools), and 14–16 (upper schools) or 14–18 (upper schools which also provide sixth form education). The schools, compared with other LEAs, have large numbers on the roll with school enrolment often 2000 and more. For Melton and Blaby districts, although there is division by middle and upper schools, there is only one upper school in either district, giving no choice of school. However, many students of Lutterworth College in Harborough district actually hail from Blaby district.

Charnwood has the largest school population – four times the size of the Melton district.  In 2007, the best-performing state school at GCSE was Beauchamp College in Oadby. No comprehensives in Leicestershire LEA were rated as poor performers, unlike in some neighbouring counties. In 2007, 7,800 pupils took GCSE exams.

For A-levels, the best comprehensive school in the county was the De Lisle College in Loughborough. The best schools overall at A-level were the two private single-sex schools in Loughborough, Loughborough Grammar School and Loughborough High School.

GCSE results by district council
% of pupils gaining 5 grades A–C in 2007 including English and Maths (46.8% was the England average compared to Leicestershire's 48.9%).
 Harborough 56.3
 Oadby and Wigston 55.4
 Hinckley and Bosworth 48.5
 Charnwood 47.9
 North West Leicestershire 46.5
 Melton 41.0
 Blaby 41.0
 (City of Leicester Unitary Authority 36.5)

Independent schools
Independent schools in Leicestershire include Leicester Grammar School (mixed), Leicester High School for Girls (girls), Loughborough Grammar School (boys), Loughborough High School (girls), Fairfield Preparatory School (primary school – mixed), Welbeck College (military 6th form college – mixed), Ratcliffe College (Roman Catholic – mixed), Grace Dieu Manor School (Roman Catholic – mixed), Stoneygate school (primary school – mixed), and Stoneygate College (mixed), Our Lady's Convent School (OLCS) (Roman Catholic – girls).

Further education
There are four general further education colleges operating in Leicestershire; Leicester College, Loughborough College, South Leicestershire College and Stephenson College. All offer various vocational courses as well as apprenticeships and some academic courses.

Brooksby Melton College provides apprenticeships and further education training courses in animal care, countryside, equine, fisheries, and land based service engineering, at their Brooksby campus.

Higher education
Leicestershire has three universities, the University of Leicester, Loughborough University and De Montfort University.

Educational associations
Several educational associations have their head offices in Leicestershire, including the Mathematical Association, the Association of School and College Leaders, the Association for College Management, the Girls Schools Association, the National Adult School Association, the National Institute of Adult Continuing Education and the Headmasters & Headmistresses Conference.

Sporting associations
A number of UK sporting bodies have their head offices in Leicestershire, including the Institute of Sports & Recreation Management, the Institute of Swimming, Volleyball England, the Great Britain Wheelchair Basketball Association, the British Hang Gliding and Paragliding Association, the British Judo Association, the British Parachute Association, the British Triathlon Federation, the Amateur Swimming Association, the British Gliding Association, the British Motorcycle Federation, the English Indoor Bowls Association, the Youth Sport Trust and the British Isles Bowls Council.

Music

The full range of music is performed in the county, from early medieval, European and Asian classical music, folk, jazz, blues, rock, and pop. Download Festival, a major hard rock and metal festival, is hosted at Donington Park and 110 Above Festival takes place in the north west of the county near to Twycross.

Symphony orchestras
The Leicester Symphony Orchestra and the Leicestershire Schools Symphony Orchestra are two of the larger orchestras based in the county. The Philharmonia Orchestra, though based in London, holds annual residencies in Leicester.

Amateur orchestras
Amateur orchestras include the Leicestershire Sinfonia, Loughborough Orchestra, Charnwood Orchestra, Coalville Light Orchestra and Soar Valley Music Centre Orchestra.

Choirs and choral societies
Leicester-based choirs include the Leicester Cathedral Choir, Leicester Bach Choir, Broom Leys Choral Society Whitwick, Cantamici, the Cecilian Singers, Charnwood Choral Society, Coalville and District Male Voice Choir, Coro Nostro Chamber Choir, Humberstone Choral Society, Kainé Gospel Choir, Kingfisher Chorale, Leicester Church Music Consort, Leicester City Male Voice Choir, Leicester Philharmonic Choir, Leicestershire Chorale, Loughborough Ladies Choir, Loughborough Male Voice Choir, Meridian Singers, Newtown Linford mixed voice choir, Red Leicester choir, the Scarlet choir, Shepshed Singers, Synergy Community Choir, Wigston and district male voice choir, Unity Community Choir, and the Peepul Choir.

Early music
The Longsdale Consort perform music of the renaissance and baroque periods. Leicester Recorder Society.

Music shops
Stores selling sheet music and musical instruments in Leicestershire include Music Junkie Ltd, Sona Rupa (Indian), Intasound Music Ltd and MH Music (MH Music are actually in the centre of Market Harborough).

Towns and villages

Places of interest

See also

 Centre points of the United Kingdom
 Custos Rotulorum of Leicestershire – List of keepers of the Rolls
 High Sheriff of Leicestershire
 Leicestershire (UK Parliament constituency) – Historical list of MPs for the Leicestershire constituency
 Leicestershire and Rutland Fire and Rescue Service
 Leicestershire Police
 Leicestershire Police and Crime Commissioner
 List of birds of Leicestershire and Rutland
 List of people from Leicester and Leicestershire
 Lord Lieutenant of Leicestershire
 University Hospitals of Leicester NHS Trust

References

External links

 Leicester News
 Leicestershire County Council
 Wartime Leicestershire
 Heraldry of Leicestershire
 Official tourism website for Leicester & Leicestershire
 Leicestershire and Rutland Gardens Trust
 Images of Leicestershire  at the English Heritage Archive

 
Non-metropolitan counties
East Midlands
Counties of England established in antiquity